Nicole Riner (born 13 June 1990) is a retired Swiss tennis player.

In her career, Riner won four singles and three doubles titles on the ITF Circuit. On 3 August 2009, she reached her best singles ranking of world No. 265. On 14 September 2009, she peaked at No. 321 in the doubles rankings.

Riner played two matches for the Switzerland Fed Cup team in 2006.

ITF Circuit finals

Singles: 6 (4 titles, 2 runner-ups)

Doubles: 7 (3 titles, 4 runner-ups)

Fed Cup participation

Singles

References

External links
 
 
 

1990 births
Living people
Sportspeople from Nidwalden
Swiss female tennis players